René Herbin (1911 – 1 September 1953) was a French composer and pianist, who died accidentally in the Mount Cimet air disaster in the French Alps.

Life 
Born in Vitry-le-François, Herbin entered the Conservatoire de Paris at 14 years old. There he studied piano with Isidore Philipp and composition with Noël Gallon and Henri Busser. He won two First Prizes. At 26, he accompanied the cellist Maurice Maréchal on a tour of the Middle East. But the war broke out and Herbin was mobilized in 1939. He was taken prisoner in Germany where he remained in captivity for nearly 5 years in several forced labour camps. Interned in very precarious conditions, he nevertheless managed to write many works: a Sonata for violin and piano, Deïrdre des Douleurs for chamber orchestra, Sonata for piano, Album d'images, Preludes baroques, for piano. Returning to Paris in 1945, he resumed his activities as a pianist and composer, and premiered his first piano quartet in 1949 with the Trio Pasquier. In the early 1950s, the State and Radio placed orders with him. It was on this occasion that he composed Trois Songes pour orchestre (1951) and the Concerto pour piano (1952) whose posthumous premiere was ensured in 1956 by Vlado Perlemuter.

Death 
On September 1, 1953, René Herbin, accompanied by the violinist Jacques Thibaud, boarded the Paris-Saigon flight, the city where the musicians were expected to perform in concert. As they approached the planned stopover at Nice airport, their plane crashed on mount Cimet in the French Alps. There were no survivors among the 42 people on board.

Société Musicale René Herbin 
In 1992, Elizabeth Herbin, pianist and daughter of the composer, founded the Société Musicale René Herbin, which was then presided by Vlado Perlemuter and Henri Dutilleux. Its purpose is to make the man and his work known, and to disseminate his music, which is still too confidential and not very well recorded. It thus repairs what the untimely death of a 42-year-old musician recognized by his peers, took away from the French musical life of the first half of the 20th century.

Compositions 
List of works by Herbin.
 1929: Toccata 
 1929-1930: 12  Préludes, for piano 
 1930: Fantaisie, for piano 
 1934: Ballade, for piano 
 1934-1935: 6 Études de haute virtuosité, for piano 
 1936: 6 pièces en forme de suite, for violin and piano 
 1936: Poème, for piano and cello
 1940: Album d'images, for piano 
 1940-1941: 2 divertissements, for piano (Max Eschig) 
 1940-1941: Préludes baroques, for piano 
 1941: Préambule pour le "Chapeau chinois" de Franc Nohain, for piano, string quintet, flute, clarinet in Bb 
 1941: Préambule pour le "Chapeau chinois" de Franc Nohain, for piano, violin and cello 
 1942: Sonata for piano 
 1942: Sonata for violin and piano 
 1943: 3  Préludes baroques, for 2 pianos (author's transcription)
 1943: Miniatures, for violin and piano [lost piano part] 
 1943: Suite fantasque, for piano 
 1944: Deïrdre des douleurs, for flute and piano (transcription by the author)
 1944: Deïrdre des douleurs, version for chamber orchestra
 1944: La mort et le pendu, for grand orchestre 
 1945: Burlesque, for clarinet in B flat and String Quartet 
 1945: Burlesque for piano and clarinet in B flat (transcription by the author) 
 1945: Mirages, for oboe and piano 
 1946: Thème et variation, for piano 
 1948: La mort et le pendu, for 2 pianos (author's transcription) 
 1948: La mort et le pendu, for 4-handed piano 
 1948: Poulenc-adagietto, for 2 pianos (transcription) 
 1948: Prière, for piano 
 1948: Prières, for string quartet 
 1949: 1st Piano Quartet   
 1949: Baptême, for flute and piano (transcription by the author) 
 1949: Baptême, for piano, flute, oboe, violin, cello and harp (premiere with Lily Laskine) 
 1949: Sonata for piano and cello 
 1950: Petite suite Radio française, for piano 
 1950: Petites pièces, for piano 
 1950: Petite suite Radio-française "dans l'esprit" des vieux contes français, for grand orchestre (commande de Radio-France) (premiered by  Manuel Rosenthal) 
 1951: Divertissement, for chamber orchestra (commission from Radio-France) 
 1951: Divertissement, for piano, 2 violins, cello, double bass and drums 
 1951: Divertissement, for violin and piano (author's transcription) 
 1951: Dona Rosita ou le langage des fleurs, for piano, 2 violins and cello (transcription by the author) 
 1951: Dona Rosita ou le langage des fleurs, for voice and piano 
 1951: Trois songes, for large orchestra (commissioned by the State)  
 1951: 4 impromptus, for piano 
 1952: Concerto pour piano et orchestre (commissioned by the State) (premiered by  Vlado Perlemuter) 
 1952: Polka, for 4-handed piano (transcription by the author). Dona Rosita) 
 1953: Dance for piano and saxophone in Eb (Billaudot) premiered by  Vlado Perlemuter) 
 1953: Rossini-boutique-fantasque, for 2 pianos (transcription)                         
 1953: Une fausse gavotte, for piano and clarinet in B flat(Billaudot)

Recordings 
 René Herbin: 1st Quartet for piano and string trio, Élisabeth Herbin, piano; Alexis Galpérine, violin; Bruno Pasquier, viola; Mark Drobinsky cello (+ Florent Schmitt: Légende, String quartet Les Hasards), CD - 711, Éd. Gallo, 1993.
 Discography (Discogs)

References

External links and sources 
 Biography
 Dedicated website
 Presentation leaflet of the above-mentioned CD, texts by Pierrette Germain and Alexis Galpérine
 René Herbin, Piano Quartet No. 1: I. Rustique (YouTube)

1911 births
1953 deaths
People from Vitry-le-François
Conservatoire de Paris alumni
20th-century French composers
20th-century French male classical pianists
French military personnel of World War II
French prisoners of war in World War II
World War II prisoners of war held by Germany